Elnathan John (born 1982) is a Nigerian novelist, satirist and lawyer whose stories have twice been shortlisted for the Caine Prize for African Writing.

Career 
Elnathan John was born in Kaduna, in north-west Nigeria, in 1982. He attended Ahmadu Bello University, Zaria, and the Nigerian Law School, where he obtained law degrees.

His short story Bayan Layi, published in Per Contra, was shortlisted for the Caine Prize for African Writing in 2013. He was shortlisted again for the Caine Prize in 2015 for his short story Flying.

His writing has been published in The Economist, The Guardian, Per Contra, Hazlitt, ZAM Magazine, Evergreen Review, and Chimurenga's The Chronic.

John's first novel, Born on a Tuesday was published in 2016 by Cassava Republic Press in 2015 and in the US by Grove Atlantic. Born on a Tuesday was shortlisted in September 2016 for the NLNG Nigeria Prize for Literature, Africa's largest literary award it won a Betty Trask Award.

His second book, Be(com)ing Nigerian, A Guide, a collection of satirical pieces, was published by Cassava Republic Press in 2019.

His third book, a graphic novel, was published by Cassava Republic Press in November 2019. The book is illustrated by Alaba Onajin.

Elnathan John is a Civitella Ranieri Fellow. He writes a weekly satirical column for the Sunday Trust Newspaper and speaks regularly on Nigerian literature, media and politics. He is one of the judges of the 2019 Man Booker International Prize.

Awards and listings 
 2013: Shortlisted for the Caine Prize for African Writing
 2015: Shortlisted for the Caine Prize for African Writing
 2016: Shortlisted for the Nigeria Prize for Literature
 2017: Longlisted for the Etisalat Prize for African Literature
 2017: Shortlisted for the Republic of Consciousness Prize
 2017: WINNER Betty Trask Award
 2018: Miles Morland Writing Scholarship
2019: WINNER Prix Les Afriques

Bibliography 
 Bayan Layi (2013)
 Flying (2015)
 Born on a Tuesday (2016)
 Be(com)ing Nigerian (2019)
 On Ajayi Crowther Street (2019)

References

External links
 Elnathan John official website
 Elnathan's Dark Corner blog
 Elnathan John on Twitter
 Gen de Botton, "An Indies Introduce Q&A With Elnathan John", ABA – American Booksellers Association, 5 July 2016.

1982 births
Living people
Ahmadu Bello University alumni
Nigerian male novelists
Satirists
People from Abuja
21st-century male writers
21st-century Nigerian novelists